James M. Adams of Oconto, Wisconsin (May 4, 1834October 19, 1875) was an American physician, politician, and Wisconsin pioneer.  He served in the Wisconsin State Assembly, representing Oconto County.

Biography
James M. Adams was born in Castleton, Vermont, in May 1834.  He received a common school education and attended Rush Medical College in Chicago.  He moved to Wisconsin in 1852 and initially settled at Greenbush, Wisconsin, in Sheboygan County.  He moved to Oconto County, Wisconsin, sometime before 1869 and was elected to represent the county in the Wisconsin State Assembly for the 1870 session.

He died in his sleep and was discovered by his daughter on the morning of October 19, 1875.

References

External links

1834 births
1875 deaths
People from Castleton, Vermont
People from Oconto, Wisconsin
Democratic Party members of the Wisconsin State Assembly
Physicians from Wisconsin
Rush Medical College alumni
People from Shawano County, Wisconsin
19th-century American politicians